The 1903 Holy Cross football team was an American football team that represented the College of the Holy Cross in the 1903 college football season. In its first season under head coach Frank Cavanaugh, the team compiled an 8–2 record. Tom Stankard was the team captain. 

After years of playing home games at off-campus stadiums in Worcester, Massachusetts, Holy Cross opened its own football field in time for the start of the 1903 season. The new stadium, called simply Holy Cross Field by the press, was later named Fitton Field, and today serves as the college's baseball stadium.

Schedule

References

Holy Cross
Holy Cross Crusaders football seasons
Holy Cross football